Cheung Suet Yee (born 29 August 1965) is a Hong Kong hurdler. She competed in the women's 100 metres hurdles at the 1988 Summer Olympics.

References

External links
 

1965 births
Living people
Athletes (track and field) at the 1988 Summer Olympics
Hong Kong female hurdlers
Olympic athletes of Hong Kong
Place of birth missing (living people)